Ashhurst Railway Station exists on the Palmerston North–Gisborne Line between Palmerston North and the Manawatu Gorge serving the town of Ashhurst. The station existed as a flag-stop station before being made a formal stop in 1892. The station was sold in 1980 and the buildings and facilities were demolished sometime after and replaced with a simple shelter. The station was closed in 2001. No regular passenger service uses the line and there are no-longer any structures at the station; only the abandoned platform remains.

In the 1937-38 financial year, the passenger count was totaled at 7,924.

A number of Railway Cottages were built to the north of the Station on the Manawatu Scenic Route Road level crossing. One of which proved to cause poor visibility at the level crossing and was recommended for removal. The Ashhurst over-bridge was later constructed. As of 2022, three 1920s-scheme houses remain along-side a railway house of the 1930s-50 schemes.

References

Defunct railway stations in New Zealand
Rail transport in Manawatū-Whanganui
Buildings and structures in Manawatū-Whanganui
Railway stations opened in 1892
Railway stations closed in 2001